Hopkirk is a surname. Notable people with the surname include: 

Cyril Hopkirk, New Zealand veterinary scientist
Paddy Hopkirk, rally driver
Peter Hopkirk, British journalist
Thomas Hopkirk, Scottish botanist and lithographer

Fictional characters
Marty Hopkirk, a main character of Randall and Hopkirk (Deceased)